The list of people from Kansas City, Missouri is for native-born and past residents. Kansas City, Missouri is the central city of the Kansas City metropolitan area. People only from Kansas are at List of people from Kansas City, Kansas.

A

Bud Abell – linebacker in the American Football League; born in Kansas City
Oleta Adams – singer
Amy Alcott (born 1956) – Hall of Fame professional golfer; born in Kansas City
M.A. Alford – multimedia artist
Henry Wilson Allen – Western author and screenwriter
Robert Altman – film director
Raleigh DeGeer Amyx – collector of Olympic and Presidential memorabilia
Ernest Appy – composer and cellist
Stewart Ashby Jr. – rapper
Edward Asner – actor, born in Kansas City
Ashley Aull – 2006 Miss Kansas USA
AY Young – musical artist, born in Kansas City

B

Burt Bacharach – pianist and composer
Parrish Baker – cartoonist
Joy Bang – actress born in Kansas City 
Kay Barnes – mayor of Kansas City 1999–2007
H. Roe Bartle – mayor of Kansas City and namesake of Kansas City Chiefs
Count Basie – jazz musician and bandleader
Noah Beery – actor
Wallace Beery – Oscar-winning actor
Thomas Hart Benton – artist
Richard L. Berkley – politician, former mayor
Ken Berry – baseball player
Danni Boatwright – Survivor: Guatemala winner; Miss Kansas
Johnny Yong Bosch – actor, martial artist, voice actor, and musician
Connee Boswell – singer
Diane Brewster – actress
Beau Brinkley – long snapper for the Atlanta Falcons
Bob Brookmeyer – jazz musician, composer, and bandleader
Elizabeth Broun – art historian and director of the Smithsonian American Art Museum
Walter Brown – blues musician
Sylvia Browne – psychic and medium

C

 Melvin Calhoun – rapper
Danny Carey –  drummer for rock band Tool
John D. Carmack – game programmer
Joe Carter – baseball player with Cleveland Indians and Toronto Blue Jays, lives in the city known for winning the 1993 World Series on a walk-off 3 run home run.
Vincent O. Carter – writer
Don Cheadle – actor, Hotel Rwanda, Ocean's Eleven, Crash
Anthony Civella – mobster
Emanuel Cleaver – politician, U.S. Representative for Fifth District in Missouri
Gene Clark – singer-songwriter with The Byrds
Jonathan Coachman – ESPN sportscaster, wrestling commentator, college basketball player
Jennifer Jo Cobb –  NASCAR Camping World Truck Series driver
Robert Coldsnow – Kansas legislator and lawyer
Vinson Cole – operatic tenor
 David Cone – Major League Baseball pitcher
Evan S. Connell – author
Chris Cooper – Oscar-winning actor
John Coughlin – figure skater, 2011 U.S. pairs champion
Joan Crawford – Oscar-winning actor
 Walter Cronkite – CBS television journalist, news anchor

D

 Marcus Denmon – NBA player
 Bob Dernier – MLB outfielder
 DeLos F. DeTar – scientist
Walt Disney – film producer, director, screenwriter, voice actor, and animator
Sophia Dominguez-Heithoff – model and Miss Teen USA 2017
James T. Draper Jr. – president of the Southern Baptist Convention 1982–1984; pastor of Red Bridge Baptist Church in Kansas City 1965–1970
Carol Duboc – singer, composer, arranger, and actress

E
James E. Edmondson – Oklahoma Supreme Court Justice

F
Harris Faulkner – newscaster
Samantha Fish – musician
Scott Foley – actor
 Lisa Forbes – Miss Kansas and Miss Earth USA 2007
William P. Foster – band director
Thomas Frank – writer, editor
Josh Freeman – NFL quarterback
Matt Freije – NBA player
Friz Freleng – film producer, director, animator, and cartoonist

G
Caroline Glaser – The Voice contestant
Maurice Greene – sprinter, gold-medalist Olympian in track and field
Masten Gregory – auto racing
Eddie Griffin – comedian and actor, Deuce Bigalow, Undercover Brother
Karolyn Grimes – actress, Zu-Zu in the Frank Capra classic It's a Wonderful Life, lived in town for many years

H

Donald J. Hall, Sr. – businessman
Joyce Hall – businessman, founder of Hallmark Cards
Leon Harden – football player for Green Bay Packers
Jean Harlow – actress
Jessica Harp – country music singer-songwriter, former member of The Wreckers with Michelle Branch
Thomas Hayward – leading tenor of Metropolitan Opera
Robert A. Heinlein – science fiction author; his stories are frequently set in or reference Kansas City
Ernest Hemingway – iconic novelist and short story author
Shauntay Henderson – FBI Ten Most Wanted fugitive, convicted criminal
Paul Henning – writer, producer of The Beverly Hillbillies TV series
Opal Hill – golfer and LPGA co-founder
Jerry Hines – Emmy Award-winning photographer, voted cutest baby of Kansas City 1975
Ralph F. Hirschmann (1922–2009) – biochemist who led synthesis of first enzyme
Mabel Hite – vaudeville and musical comedy performer, father worked at Owl Drug Store
Clara Cleghorn Hoffman (1831–1908) – temperance activist
Bob Holden – 53rd Governor of Missouri
Dorothy B. Hughes – novelist
 Jane Dee Hull – 20th Governor of Arizona
 Jim Humphreys – prominent Texas rancher

I
Sean Ingram – musician and entrepreneur
Ub Iwerks – animator and cartoonist

J
Pete Johnson – blues and jazz pianist
Elaine Joyce – actress

K

Tim Kaine – former Governor and current U.S. Senator from Virginia; 2016 Democratic nominee for Vice president under Hillary Clinton
Krizz Kaliko (born Samuel Watson Jr.) – rapper
Jason Kander – former Missouri Secretary of State
John Kander – composer
Ewing Kauffman – pharmaceutical magnate, philanthropist, and Major League Baseball owner
Ellie Kemper – actress, The Office, Unbreakable Kimmy Schmidt
Vern Kennedy – baseball pitcher
Bill Kenney – politician, ex-Chiefs player
Edward Kerr – actor, Above Suspicion, Confessions of a Sexist Pig, The Astronaut's Wife
Craig Kilborn – actor, sportscaster, talk show host
Philip Klutznick – U.S. Secretary of Commerce to President Jimmy Carter
Evalyn Knapp – actress
 Dianna Kelly – Marconi Award winning Monk & Kelly Show Formerly of Star 102

L
Sarah Lancaster – actress
Frank Sherman Land – Freemason and founder of Order of DeMolay, international organization for young men
Barbara Lawrence – actress
William Least Heat-Moon – author
Muna Lee – three-time track and field Olympic finalist 
Jeff Leiding – football player
Lesa Lewis – IFBB professional bodybuilder
Ryan Lilja – NFL player for Indianapolis Colts and Kansas City Chiefs, Shawnee Mission Northwest High School graduate
Tyronn Lue – NBA player and current head coach of the Cleveland Cavaliers, Raytown Senior High School
Betty Lynn – actress best known for playing Thelma Lou on The Andy Griffith Show

M

Bill Maas – NFL player
Arthur Mag – lawyer, legal counsel to Harry S. Truman
Sean Malto – professional skateboarder
Amanda Marsh – first winner of The Bachelor
Denny Matthews – sportscaster, author
John Mayberry Jr. – baseball outfielder with Philadelphia Phillies
Claire McCaskill – politician and senator
Edie McClurg – actress
Courtney McCool – athlete and Olympian
Glenn McGee – bioethicist and philosopher
Katherine McNamara – actress, Shadowhunters
Jay McShann – blues musician
Pat Metheny – jazz guitarist
Frederick H. Michaelis – U.S. Navy Admiral
Sue Miller – breast cancer activist
Janelle Monáe – singer
Wendy Moniz – actress
Jonathan Monk – Marconi Award winning Monk & Kelly show Formerly of Star 102
Julia Montgomery – actress in Revenge of the Nerds and One Life to Live
Dennis Moore – Congressman, politician
Logan Morrison – baseball player
Paul Morrison – politician
Tommy Morrison – heavyweight boxer
Bennie Moten – pianist, bandleader
Mancow Muller – radio personality
Richard B. Myers – U.S. Air Force General and former Chairman of the Joint Chiefs of Staff

N
Rob Neyer – sportswriter
Danielle Nicole – blues and soul musician
Jesse Clyde Nichols – developer of commercial and residential real estate
William F. Nolan – author

O
 Buck O'Neil – baseball player, scout, and coach; first African-American coach in the MLB; helped establish the Negro League Hall of Fame

P
Satchel Paige – baseball pitcher
Charlie Parker – jazz saxophonist and composer
Gordon Parks – screenwriter, director, actor, photographer
Mark Patton – actor 
Jamie Paulin-Ramirez – American Muslim convert arrested in Jihad Jane plot to kill a Danish artist
Rodney Peete – NFL quarterback, Fox Sports TV host
Tom Pendergast – political boss
Tom Pernice Jr. – professional golfer
Darrell Porter – professional baseball player, author
Joe Posnanski – sports writer, author
William Powell – actor
The Pruitt Twins – (identical twin brothers, Miles Pruitt and Milas Pruitt), blues musicians

R

Joe Randa – baseball player
Rudy Reyes – actor and former U.S. Marine Sargent 
Bullet Rogan – baseball player
Ginger Rogers – dancer, Academy Award-winning actress, Broadway performer
Michael Rosbash – geneticist at Brandeis University, Nobel Laureate
Karl L. Rundberg (1899–1969) – Los Angeles City Council member
Brandon Rush – NBA player
Kareem Rush – NBA player
Pierre Russell – basketball player

S
Ray Sadecki – Major League Baseball pitcher
Lori Saunders – actress, Petticoat Junction
Rachel Saunders – 2005 Miss Kansas USA
Melana Scantlin – Miss Missouri USA and Average Joe star, co-host of World Series of Blackjack
Wes Scantlin – lead singer and rhythm guitarist of rock band Puddle of Mudd, cousin of Melana Scantlin
Nick Schnebelen – blues rock musician
Ted Shawn – modern dance pioneer
Columbus Short – choreographer, actor, singer
Sam Simmons – former NFL and Arena Football League player
Crystal Smith – model
Jack Sock – professional tennis player
Alberto Sordi – Italian actor (honorary citizen)
Kate Spade – fashion designer
Alexis Spight – gospel musician
Casey Stengel – baseball player and Hall of Fame manager
Michael Stevens – educator and Internet celebrity
George Strohmeyer – football player
Justin Swift – football player with NFL's Detroit Lions

T

Myra Taylor – blues singer, solo career and member of the Wild Women of Kansas 
Tech N9ne (Aaron D. Yates) – rapper
Bobb'e J. Thompson – child actor
Virgil Thomson – Pulitzer Prize-winning composer
Calvin Trillin – food writer, journalist, humorist
Marion A. Trozzolo – businessman, River Quay
Harry S. Truman – 33rd President of the United States (from Independence, Missouri)
Lisa Tucker – writer
Big Joe Turner – blues singer

V
Henry Clay Van Noy – owner of Van Noy Railway News and Hotel Company (today known as HMSHost)
Grace VanderWaal – singer-songwriter, ukuleleist, and season 11 winner of NBC's America's Got Talent

W
Janie Wagstaff – 1992 olympic swimmer
Dee Wallace – actress,  E.T. the Extra-Terrestrial
Earl Watson – basketball player
Orla Watson – inventor
Tom Watson – professional golfer, twice Masters champion, five-time British Open winner, World Golf Hall of Fame
Ben Webster – jazz saxophonist
Jason Whitlock – sports journalist
Charles Wheeler – Kansas City Mayor
Frank White – professional baseball player
Dianne Wiest – two-time Oscar-winning actress
Chuck Wild – recording artist, songwriter and composer
Jason Wiles – actor, played Maurice 'Bosco' Boscorelli in TV series Third Watch
Barry Winchell – Private First Class, murdered by a fellow soldier for his sexual orientation
Smoky Joe Wood – a.k.a. The Kansas Cyclone; professional baseball player for Boston Red Sox and Cleveland Indians
Doug Worgul – journalist and author of the novel Thin Blue Smoke
Chely Wright – country music singer
Katie Wright – actress; married to Hank Azaria
Jack Wyatt – host of ABC's Confession (1958–1959); Episcopalian priest

See also
 List of people from Missouri
 List of people from Kansas City, Kansas

References

Kansas City

Kansas City#